Robert Allan "Gus" Lyons (July 8, 1890 – December 27, 1984) was a bond broker and political figure in British Columbia. He represented Victoria City from 1924 to 1928 as a Conservative.

He was born in London, Ontario, the son of Robert A. Lyons and Margaret Clark. Lyons served during World War I and was wounded, losing a leg. He was awarded the Distinguished Conduct Medal and the French Croix de Guerre. Lyons reached the rank of major. He died in Vancouver at the age of 94.

References 

1890 births
1984 deaths
Canadian military personnel of World War I
British Columbia Conservative Party MLAs
Politicians from London, Ontario
Recipients of the Croix de Guerre 1914–1918 (France)
Canadian recipients of the Distinguished Conduct Medal